Palaeoargyra is an extinct genus of flies in the family Dolichopodidae, known from Baltic amber. It contains only one species, Palaeoargyra mutabilis. It was originally proposed as a subgenus of Argyra, but was later considered a separate genus.

No type species had been designated for the genus until 1994, when Neal Evenhuis described P. dytei. However, in 2014, Igor Grichanov found that the genus had apparently been proposed for Argyra mutabilis, and that P. dytei was a synonym of this species.

References

†
†
†
Prehistoric Diptera genera
Baltic amber
Priabonian insects